Rock Entertainment (formerly RTL CBS Entertainment and Blue Ant Entertainment; stylized as ROCK entertainment) is a 24/7 Southeast Asian English-language television channel owned by Rock Entertainment Holdings. Launched in 2013, it was initially called RTL CBS Asia Entertainment Network, a joint-venture of RTL Group and CBS Studios International. This channel launched on September 1, 2013 which focuses on entertainment and variety shows and broadcast in high-definition. Within 2 years, the channel became available in 2015 to Philippine cable viewers with a separate feed.

On January 1, 2018, the channel was renamed Blue Ant Entertainment after Blue Ant Media's acquisition of the said channel, along with Blue Ant Extreme.

On August 18, 2021, it was announced that Blue Ant Entertainment and Blue Ant Extreme will rebrand to Rock Entertainment and Rock Extreme starting September 1. Blue Ant Media Asia, the owner of the said channels, was officially renamed as Rock Entertainment Holdings and continues to operate other Blue Ant Media channels (Love Nature, Smithsonian Channel, Makeful and ZooMoo), as well as Global Trekker and Outdoor Channel for the Southeast Asian region.

On December 12, 2022, Rock Entertainment Holdings has restructured their contents, with the plan to focused on movies and special events, which also lead to the launch of the sister channel Rock Action as the replacement for Rock Extreme.

Operating channels

Rock Entertainment (HDTV, Asia except Philippines)
Rock Entertainment (Philippines) – Joint-venture with Asian Cable Communications

Current programs
 30 Rock
 A.P. Bio
 Brave New World
 Bull
 Come Dance with Me
 Chucky
 Crime Scene Kitchen
 Devils
 FBI
 First Dates
 Four Weddings And A Funeral
 Late Night with Seth Meyers
 Law & Order: Special Victims Unit
 Masterchef Australia Junior
 Motherland: Fort Salem
 NCIS
 Star Trek: Discovery
 The Good Fight
 The InBetween
 The Masked Singer UK
 The Masked Dancer UK
 The Masked Singer US
 The Tonight Show Starring Jimmy Fallon
 The X Factor UK

TV Specials
American Music Awards (since 2014)
Hollywood Film Awards
People Magazine Awards
People's Choice Awards (since 2016)
Golden Globe Awards (2015–2021)
Critics' Choice Movie Awards (since 2015)
Screen Actors Guild Awards (2015–2022 as Netflix holds global rights starting with 29th Screen Actors Guild Awards.)  
Billboard Music Awards (since 2015)
Critics' Choice Television Awards (since 2015)
Dick Clark's New Year's Rockin' Eve (2015–2022)
Asian Television Awards (since 2015)

See also
 Rock Extreme

References

Television channels and stations established in 2013
Mass media companies established in 2013
Entertainment companies of Singapore
Mass media in Southeast Asia
Former CBS Corporation subsidiaries
English-language television stations